KTBR (950 AM) is a radio station licensed to Roseburg, Oregon. The station is owned by Southern Oregon University, and is an affiliate of Jefferson Public Radio, airing JPR's "News & Information" service, consisting of news and talk programming.

External links
ijpr.org

TBR
NPR member stations
Southern Oregon University
Roseburg, Oregon
Radio stations established in 1956
1956 establishments in Oregon